From Detroit to St Germain is a compilation of songs composed by electronic musician Ludovic Navarre, also known as St. Germain. The 2xCD edition of this album has a different tracklisting. This edition was re-issued digitally in 2012, under subtitle 'The Complete Series For Connoisseurs'.

In 2009 it was awarded a silver certification from the Independent Music Companies Association which indicated sales of at least 30,000 copies throughout Europe.

Track listing

References

St. Germain (musician) albums
1999 albums